Nina Bratchikova and Darija Jurak were the defending champions. Jurak decided not to defend her title. Bratchikova teamed up with Vladimíra Uhlířová as the top seeds, but they lost to Eva Hrdinová and Karolína Plíšková in the quarterfinals after retiring in the second set.

Maria Elena Camerin and Vera Dushevina won the tournament, defeating the Czech pairing of Hrdinová and Plíšková in the final, 7–5, 6–3.

Seeds

Draw

References 
 Draw

Al Habtoor Tennis Challenge - Doubles
Al Habtoor Tennis Challenge
2012 in Emirati tennis